U.S. government investigations into Russian interference in the 2016 elections, and the links between Russian intelligence and Trump associates, started with the FBI's Crossfire Hurricane investigation (July 31, 2016, to May 17, 2017), and continued with the "Mueller investigation" (or Special Counsel investigation, 2017–2019) which was established after President Donald Trump fired the director of the FBI James Comey, (raising suspicions of obstruction of justice). The Mueller investigation concluded that Russian interference was "sweeping and systematic" and "violated U.S. criminal law", and indicted Russian citizens and Russian organizations. The investigation "identified numerous links between the Russian government and the Trump campaign". The investigation resulted in charges against 34 individuals and 3 companies, 8 guilty pleas, and a conviction at trial. However it concluded that though the Trump campaign welcomed the Russian activities and expected to benefit from them, there was insufficient evidence to bring any conspiracy or coordination charges against Trump or his associates, and that they were prevented from reaching a conclusion on whether Trump had obstructed justice by a Justice Department guideline prohibiting the federal indictment of a sitting president.

The Russia investigation origins counter-narrative, or Russia counter-narrative, is a conspiracy theory narrative embraced by Donald Trump, Republican Party leaders, and right-wing conservatives attacking the legitimacy and conclusions of the investigations. The narrative includes conspiracy theories such as Spygate, accusations of a secretive, all-powerful elite "deep state" network, and other false and debunked claims. Trump in particular has attacked not only the origins but the conclusions of the investigation, and ordered a review of the Mueller report, which was conducted by attorney general William Barr – alleging there was a "deep state plot" to undermine him. He has claimed the investigations were an "illegal hoax", (they have been dubbed the Russia Collusion Hoax), and that the "real collusion" was between Hillary Clinton, Democrats, and Russia – and later, Ukraine.

However, a further investigation by the Republican-controlled Senate Intelligence Committee confirmed the intelligence community's claim that Putin's "interference in the 2016 U.S. presidential election" in favor of Trump was unprecedented in its "manner and aggressiveness", and an investigation of the investigations by the United States Department of Justice Office of the Inspector General found the origin of the FBI investigation was properly predicated on a legal and factual basis, and found no support for several conspiracy theories about the origin promoted by conservatives.

Russia counter-narrative 
According to the Trump administration, the Russia investigation should never have happened in the first place as it was a plot by law enforcement and intelligence officials to prevent Trump from winning the 2016 election, and then, once he won the election, to frustrate his "America First" agenda. Trump rejects the conclusion of US intelligence agencies that Russia interfered in the 2016 election to benefit candidate Trump, suggesting without evidence instead that hostile American officials may have planted false information that led to the Russia inquiry.

Trump frequently expressed the concern that those findings called into question the legitimacy of his presidency. He attacked the Russia investigation over 1,100 times by February 2019, claiming that it was fabricated as an excuse for Hillary Clinton losing the Electoral College in 2016, that it was an "illegal hoax", and that the FBI had refused to investigate the "real collusion" between the Democrats and Russia – and later, Ukraine. However, three years after the election the FBI Director appointed by Trump, Christopher A. Wray, stated: "We have no information that indicates that Ukraine interfered with the 2016 presidential election. ... [A]s far as the [2020] election itself goes, we think Russia represents the most significant threat."

From the outset, conservatives tried to delegitimize the Mueller investigation. Republican Party leaders suggested that Robert Mueller's inquiry stemmed from a plot by members of the Obama Administration and career intelligence officials—an alleged "deep state"—to undermine Trump.

On April 2, 2019, Trump personally urged investigation into the origins of the Mueller investigation. In response, Democrats and some former law enforcement officials expressed concern that Attorney General William Barr was "using the justice department to chase unsubstantiated conspiracy theories" that could cast doubt on the Mueller report's findings.

On November 22, 2019, The Washington Post reported that a forthcoming United States Department of Justice Office of the Inspector General report found the origin of the FBI investigation was properly predicated on a legal and factual basis, and the report did not support several conservative conspiracy theories about the origin. On December 9, 2019, US Inspector General Michael E. Horowitz testified to Congress that the FBI showed no political bias at the initiation of the investigation into Trump and possible connections with Russia; In a Senate hearing on December 11, 2019, he stated that he "could not rule out political bias as a possible motivation for the 17 errors the FBI made in applications for the Carter Page surveillance." In a subsequent analysis of 25 unrelated FISA warrant requests, Horowitz found a pattern of similar errors that suggested systemic sloppiness by the FBI, rather than an effort to single-out Page.

False claims about origins 

Core elements of the theory include these false claims:
 That the Steele dossier had a role in triggering the overall Russian interference investigation. Arguments against the dossier are irrelevant to this claim as the FBI did not possess or use the dossier when they opened the investigation. The Inspector General concluded that it did not play any role in the initiation of the Crossfire Hurricane Investigation; the accusation that it was fraudulent, and that "the dossier's partisan associations" were "obscured" from the FISA court in the application for surveillance Carter Page. In fact, the first FISA application did contain a footnote added at the insistence of Deputy Assistant Attorney General Stuart Evans about the potential political bias of the Steele material. Conservatives also question the FBI's assessment of the credibility of Christopher Steele, a former British intelligence officer who ran the MI6 Russia desk from 2006 to 2009. This concern was irrelevant to the question of the origins of the investigation.
 That the investigations and surveillance were illegal and treasonous "spying" (the spygate conspiracy theory) – a "FISA abuse" narrative, notably involving Susan Rice. The use of the term "spying" in this context is disputed. James Comey and James A. Baker have described the investigations as necessary, appropriate, legal, and apolitical, and FBI Director Christopher A. Wray testified that he saw "no evidence the FBI illegally monitored President Donald Trump's campaign during the 2016 election."
 That the FBI and other institutions are "dangerously biased" against Trump (the deep state conspiracy theory), that Robert S. Mueller III's investigation was run by "13 [or 18] angry Democrats" and that Mueller was "highly conflicted", a claim debunked by Trump's own aides, and the investigation was part of a failed "attempted coup", based on private texts sent by Peter Strzok expressing opposition to a Trump presidency and speculation over removal of Trump under the 25th Amendment following his firing of James Comey.
 That anti-Trump forces inside the FBI actually entrapped his advisers, such as Michael Flynn and may have even planted evidence of Russian collusion.
That Russian interference was not directed by Putin, was not as significant as the president's opponents insisted, or even decisive in the outcome of the election. Proponents point to the discrepancy in the intelligence community's report on Russian interference between the FBI and CIA's high confidence and the National Security Agency's moderate confidence.

More recently, the narrative has expanded to include the claim that Joseph Mifsud was not a Russian asset, but was a Western intelligence agent used as a counterintelligence trap for the Trump campaign, and elements of the conspiracy theories related to the Trump–Ukraine scandal; it posits that Ukraine, not Russia, was responsible for election interference. The theory further claimed that Ukraine had interfered in the elections at the behest of the Democratic Party to benefit Hillary Clinton's election campaign, and that they had planted evidence that Russia was responsible and had sought to help Trump. US Attorney General William Barr has reportedly traveled in person to Italy (twice) and to the United Kingdom to try to build support for this claim. Italian Prime Minister Giuseppe Conte contradicted this, stating that Italy had "played no role in the events leading to the Russia investigation".

On February 19, 2020, numerous sources revealed that lawyers for WikiLeaks founder Julian Assange told Westminster Magistrates' Court that Trump had Dana Rohrabacher visit Assange at the Ecuadoran Embassy in London on August 16, 2017. Assange had been in court fighting extradition to the United States on charges of computer intrusion as WikiLeaks had posted sensitive documents provided by whistleblower Chelsea Manning. During the August 16 meeting, Assange stated that Rohrabacher had made a quid pro quo offer of a presidential pardon to him, in exchange for Assange covering up Russian involvement by declaring that "Russia had nothing to do with the DNC leaks". Assange's lawyer said that he had evidence "that a quid pro quo was put to Assange by Rohrabacher, who was known as Putin's favorite congressman." White House Press Secretary Stephanie Grisham stated that Assange's claims were "a complete fabrication and a lie" and added that "the president barely knows Dana Rohrabacher other than he's an ex-congressman." Rohrabacher had previously confirmed the August 16 meeting, saying he and Assange talked about "what might be necessary to get him out" and discussed a presidential pardon in exchange for information on the theft of DNC emails that were published by WikiLeaks before the 2016 presidential election.

Notable proponents
The most notable proponent is Donald Trump himself. Following the May 2018 disclosure that FBI informant Stefan Halper had spoken with Trump campaign aides Carter Page, George Papadopoulos, and Sam Clovis, Trump advanced a conspiracy theory dubbed as Spygate, which claimed that the previous administration under Barack Obama paid to plant a spy inside Trump's 2016 presidential campaign to assist his rival, Hillary Clinton, win the 2016 US presidential election. With no actual supporting evidence produced, Trump's allegations were widely described as blatantly false. Trump's allegations prompted the US Justice Department (DOJ) and the FBI to provide a classified briefing regarding Halper to several Congressmen, including Republicans Trey Gowdy and Paul Ryan, who concluded that the FBI did not do anything improper, and that Russia, not Trump, was the target of the FBI.

In June 2018, Trump claimed that a report by DOJ Inspector General Michael E. Horowitz "totally exonerates" him and that "the Mueller investigation has been totally discredited", despite the report having nothing to do with the special counsel investigation, the Trump campaign or Russia. The report was instead focused on the FBI's 2016 investigation of the Hillary Clinton email controversy.

Sean Hannity, a strong supporter of Trump, a vocal and persistent critic of the Mueller investigation on his Fox News television show and syndicated radio program, described Mueller as "corrupt, abusively biased and political." Hannity had asserted that the investigation arose from an elaborate, corrupt scheme involving Hillary Clinton; the Steele dossier, which he asserts is completely false although parts of it have been reported as verified; former DOJ officials James Comey, Andrew McCabe, Bruce Ohr, and others; and a wiretap on former Trump aide Carter Page that Hannity asserted was obtained by misrepresentations to the United States Foreign Intelligence Surveillance Court, characterizing the wiretap as an abuse of power that is "far bigger than Watergate" and "the weaponizing of those powerful tools of intelligence and the shredding of our Fourth Amendment, constitutional rights."

Jeanine Pirro, a long-time friend of Trump, described Mueller, current FBI Director Christopher Wray (a Trump appointee), former FBI Director James Comey and other current/former FBI officials as a "criminal cabal," saying "There is a cleansing needed in our FBI and Department of Justice – it needs to be cleansed of individuals who should not just be fired, but who need to be taken out in cuffs."

Inspector General testimony and report
On December 9, 2019, Horowitz testified before the House Judiciary Committee that the FBI had an "authorized purpose" when it initiated its investigation, known as Crossfire Hurricane, into the Trump campaign. The 2019 report from Horowitz "concluded the FBI was legally justified in launching its inquiry" into Russian interference" and that there was no "documentary or testimonial evidence that political bias or improper motivation influenced the FBI's decision to conduct these operations". The report also found "'widespread' failures in FBI surveillance requests" beyond the problems with the FISA requests for Carter Page. Horowitz was particularly critical of applications the FBI made to the Foreign Intelligence Surveillance Court to monitor former Trump campaign adviser Carter Page, asserting those applications contained “significant inaccuracies and omissions” and that agents “failed to meet the basic obligation” to ensure the applications were “scrupulously accurate.” In response to this, the FBI promptly indicated it would implement dozens of corrective measures in response to Horowitz's report. Wray said the bureau accepts the findings and plans to make a host of changes, including to how they gather and submit information for surveillance applications.

Durham investigation

Review of origins of FBI's investigation
In April 2019, U.S. Attorney General William Barr told members of Congress that he believed the Trump campaign had been spied upon in 2016. John Durham, the U.S. attorney in the District of Connecticut, had already been conducting an investigation in the Department of Justice into leaks, allegedly by FBI Director James Comey, to the Washington Post about Michael Flynn that resulted in Flynn's departure from the White House.

In May 2019, Barr appointed Durham to oversee a DOJ probe into the origins of the FBI investigation into Russian interference. Acting White House Chief of Staff Mick Mulvaney tied the Durham investigation to the Ukraine scandal, as Durham sought help from Ukraine and interviewed Ukrainian citizens.

On May 23, 2019, Trump ordered the intelligence community to cooperate with the inquiry and granted Barr unprecedented full authority to declassify any intelligence information related to the matter. DOJ investigators, led by Durham, planned to interview senior Central Intelligence Agency (CIA) officers to determine how they concluded in 2016 that Russian president Vladimir Putin had personally authorized election interference to benefit candidate Trump. Politico reported in July 2019 that after becoming CIA director in 2017, Trump loyalist Mike Pompeo vigorously challenged the findings of CIA analysts that Russian interference was designed to help Trump, but he found no evidence to dispute it. The New York Times reported in July 2018 that the CIA had long nurtured a Russian source who eventually rose to a position close to Putin, allowing the source to pass key information in 2016 about Putin's direct involvement. In parallel, Trump and his allies—most notably Trump's personal attorney Rudy Giuliani—promoted an alternative narrative, alleging the Russian government had been framed, and that it was the Ukrainian government had interfered to benefit Hillary Clinton, in coordination with Democrats, the digital forensics company CrowdStrike and the FBI. Trump falsely asserted that CrowdStrike, an American company, was actually owned by a wealthy Ukrainian oligarch. In reality, Dmitri Alperovitch, a co-founder of Crowdstrike, and the likely reference, is a naturalized United States citizen who was born in Russia, not Ukraine.

Barr and Department of Justice contacts with foreign governments
In the fall of 2019, news reports publicized that Barr and the Department of Justice had contacted foreign governments to ask for help in this inquiry, and that this reportedly upset the normal practice of U.S. officials speaking with foreign politicians. Barr personally traveled to the United Kingdom and Italy to seek information, and at Barr's request Trump phoned the prime minister of Australia to request his cooperation. One British official with knowledge of Barr's requests observed, "it is like nothing we have come across before, they are basically asking, in quite robust terms, for help in doing a hatchet job on their own intelligence services." Barr sought information that Joseph Mifsud was a Western intelligence operative charged with entrapping Trump campaign advisor George Papadopoulos in order to establish a false predicate for the FBI to open an investigation into Russian interference in the 2016 United States elections.

That FBI investigation was initiated after the Australian government notified American authorities that its diplomat Alexander Downer had a chance encounter with Papadopoulos, who boasted about possible access to Hillary Clinton emails supposedly held by the Russian government. On October 2, 2019, Senator Lindsey Graham, a staunch Trump supporter and chairman of the Senate Judiciary Committee, wrote a letter to the leaders of Britain, Australia and Italy, asserting as fact that both Mifsud and Downer had been directed to contact Papadopoulos. Joe Hockey, the Australian ambassador to the United States, sharply rejected Graham's characterization of Downer. A former Italian government official told The Washington Post in October 2019 that during a meeting the previous month, Italian intelligence services told Barr they had "no connections, no activities, no interference" in the matter; Italian prime minister Giuseppe Conte later affirmed this. The Justice Department inspector general aggressively investigated the allegation that Mifsud had been directed to entrap Papadopoulos, but found no information that Mifsud was part of an FBI operation. The New York Times reported that its sources claimed Mifsud was a Russian agent. American law enforcement believes Mifsud is connected to Russian intelligence.

By October 2019, it was reported that Barr and Durham's investigators were, in addition to pressing foreign intelligence officials for help in discrediting the 2016 inquiry, also asking about the route by which information had reached the FBI, and interviewing agents involved in the 2016 inquiry. Durham also inquired about whether CIA officials had tricked the FBI into opening its 2016 investigation. Politico quoted FBI officials who were dismissive of such an assertion. Although the CIA and FBI directors shared intelligence about the matters in August 2016, former government officials said the FBI did not use CIA information to open its investigation the previous month. The Justice Department inspector general later confirmed this. Papadopoulos had previously asserted that Mifsud was "an Italian intelligence asset who the CIA weaponized" against him. Former CIA director John Brennan, a frequent Trump critic, had been singled out for suspicion by Trump and his allies, as well as former director of national intelligence James Clapper, as supposed members of a "deep state" that allegedly sought to undermine Trump.

Conviction of FBI attorney Kevin Clinesmith
On October 24, 2019, The New York Times and The Washington Post reported that Durham's inquiry had been elevated to a criminal investigation, raising concerns of politicization of the Justice Department to pursue political enemies of the President. The Times reported on November 22 that the Justice Department inspector general had made a criminal referral to Durham regarding Kevin Clinesmith, a low-level FBI attorney assigned to the Mueller probe who had resigned in February 2018. Clinesmith was accused of altering an email during the process of renewing a Foreign Intelligence Surveillance Act (FISA) wiretap warrant against former Trump campaign advisor Carter Page. Clinesmith pleaded guilty to a felony violation in August 2020 for adding the phrase "and not a source" to a statement by a CIA liaison saying that Carter Page had a prior "contact" relationship with the CIA from 2008 to 2013. On January 29, 2021, Clinesmith was sentenced to 12 months federal probation and 400 hours of community service. The judge stated that Clinesmith "likely believed that what he said about Mr. Page was true" and that he had taken "an inappropriate shortcut." He also said the IG inspection did not establish that "political considerations played a role in Clinesmith's actions."

Disagreement with DoJ Inspector General report
On December 9, following the release of Justice Department inspector general Michael E. Horowitz's report, Durham issued a statement saying, "we do not agree with some of the report’s conclusions as to predication and how the FBI case was opened." Many observers inside and outside the Justice Department, including the inspector general, expressed surprise that Durham would issue such a statement, as federal investigators typically do not publicly comment on their ongoing investigations. Barr also released a statement challenging the findings of the report. Horowitz later testified to the Senate that prior to release of the report he had asked Durham for any information he had that might change the report's findings, but "none of the discussions changed our findings." The Washington Post reported that Durham could not provide evidence of any setup by American intelligence.

Investigation of former CIA director John Brennan
The New York Times reported in December 2019 that Durham was examining the role of former CIA director John Brennan in assessing Russian interference in 2016, requesting emails, call logs and other documents. Brennan had been a vocal critic of Trump and a target of the president's accusations of improper activities toward him. The Times reported Durham was specifically examining Brennan's views of the Steele dossier and what he said about it to the FBI and other intelligence agencies. Brennan and former director of national intelligence James Clapper had testified to Congress that the CIA and other intelligence agencies did not rely on the dossier in preparing the January 2017 intelligence community assessment of Russian interference, and allies of Brennan said he disagreed with the FBI view that the dossier should be given significant weight, as the CIA characterized it as "internet rumor."

Alleged Trump pressure to finish the investigation before the 2020 election
In February 2020, The Washington Post reported that Trump was pressing the Justice Department for Durham to finish his investigation before the election. Barr hinted in June that the Durham investigation would produce results regarding the "complete collapse of the Russiagate scandal" before the end of the summer. In July Barr told a Congressional committee that the review might be released before the election despite an informal Justice Department rule limiting release of such information. In public statements in August, Trump again insisted that investigation produce more prosecutions and suggested that his opinion of Barr would be negatively influenced if it did not.

As summer ended there were reports that Barr himself was pressing for the Durham investigation to release its report. The Hartford Courant reported that unnamed colleagues of Nora Dannehy, Durham's top aide in the investigation who quietly resigned on September 10, had said she was concerned about pressure from Barr to deliver results before the election. In October, Trump ordered the declassification of all documents relating to the 2016 investigation, characterizing it as the "greatest political CRIME in American History." John Ratcliffe, the Director of National Intelligence and a Trump loyalist, released declassified Russian disinformation about Hillary Clinton to Senate Judiciary Committee Chairman Lindsey Graham. Some critics characterized the actions as a politicization of intelligence.

Appointment as Special Counsel
On November 2, 2020, the day before the presidential election, New York magazine reported that the Durham probe had uncovered no evidence of wrongdoing by former Vice President Joseph Biden or former President Barack Obama. On December 1, 2020, Attorney General Barr revealed to the Associated Press that on October 19, 2020, he had appointed Durham to be a Special Counsel pursuant to the federal statute that governed such appointments. Durham's investigation, according to Barr's statement to the Associated Press and the Attorney General's order appointing Durham as special counsel, was to examine whether "any federal official, employee, or any other person or entity violated the law in connection with the intelligence, counter-intelligence, or law-enforcement activities directed at the 2016 presidential campaigns, individuals associated with those campaigns, and individuals associated with the administration of President Donald J. Trump, including but not limited to Crossfire Hurricane and the investigation of Special Counsel Robert S. Mueller III."

Michael Sussmann trial and acquittal
On September 16, 2021, Durham indicted Michael Sussmann, a partner for the law firm Perkins Coie, alleging he falsely told FBI general counsel James Baker during a September 2016 meeting that he was not representing a client for their discussion. The indictment alleged Sussman was actually representing "a U.S. Technology Industry Executive, a U.S. Internet Company and the Hillary Clinton Presidential Campaign" and that he was involved with a project in which "researchers were tasked to mine... internet data to establish 'an inference' and 'narrative' that would tie then-presidential candidate Donald Trump to Russia."

Sussmann, who focuses on privacy and cybersecurity law, approached Baker to discuss what he claimed to be suspicious communications between computer servers at the Russian Alfa-Bank and the Trump Organization. After Trump became president, the FBI found Sussmann's claims to be meritless, and the Mueller Investigation's report ignored them. Sussmann had represented the Democratic National Committee regarding the Russian hacking of its computer network. Sussmann's attorneys have denied he was representing the Clinton campaign. Perkins Coie represented the Clinton presidential campaign, and one of its partners, Marc Elias, commissioned Fusion GPS to conduct opposition research on Trump, which led to the production of the controversial Steele dossier. Sussmann, a former federal prosecutor, characterized the allegations against him as politically motivated and pleaded not guilty the day after his indictment.

On December 6, 2021, Sussman's lawyers asked for an earlier trial date than July 25, 2022, the date proposed by Durham. The lawyers stated that evidence turned over to them by the prosecution, "partly redacted records of two of Mr. Baker's interviews with the Justice Department", contradicted the charge. The trial took place in May 2022, and the jury found Sussman not guilty. During the trial, it was revealed by Robby Mook that, even though campaign members "weren't totally confident" in the veracity of the information, in light of Trump's favorable actions toward Russian interests, leaking the suspicions of a secret backchannel to the press seemed to be justified, and Hillary Clinton agreed with that decision. Mook believed journalists would verify the story before publication.

On June 1, 2022, former Attorney General William Barr was interviewed on Fox News about the verdict in the failed prosecution of Michael Sussman. According to Ja'han Jones of MSNBC's The ReidOut Blog, Barr continued to defend Trump by repeating debunked "Russiagate" conspiracy theories about the origins of the Russia investigation by stating that the case against Sussmann "crystallized the central role played by the Hillary campaign in launching, as a dirty trick, the whole Russiagate collusion narrative." Following Sussman's acquittal, Charlie Savage wrote in The New York Times that "Mr. Barr's mandate to Mr. Durham appears to have been to investigate a series of conspiracy theories."

Alfa Bank investigation 
CNN reported in September 2021 that the Durham grand jury had subpoenaed documents from Perkins Coie. CNN had viewed emails between Sussmann and others who were researching the server communications, including the "Technology Industry Executive" who was identified as Rodney Joffe, showing that Durham's indictment of Sussmann cited only portions of the emails. The indictment included an unidentified researcher stating in an email, "The only thing that drive[s] us at this point is that we just do not like [Trump]." CNN's review of other emails indicated the researchers later broadened the scope of their examination for presentation to the FBI. Joffe's attorney asserted the indictment contained cherry-picked information to misrepresent what had transpired. Defense lawyers for the scientists who researched the Alfa Bank-Trump internet traffic said that Durham's indictment is misleading and that their clients stand by their findings. DOJ Inspector General Michael E. Horowitz wrote in his December 2019 report that “the FBI investigated whether there were cyber links between the Trump Organization and Alfa Bank but had concluded by early February 2017 that there were no such links.” The Senate Intelligence Committee's August 2020 report concluded, “Based on the FBI's assessment, the Committee did not find that the DNS activity reflected the existence of substantive or covert communications between Alfa Bank and Trump Organization personnel."

Igor Danchenko trial and acquittal
In November 2021, Washington-based Russian analyst Igor Danchenko was arrested in connection with the Durham investigation and was charged with five counts of making false statements to the FBI on five different occasions (between March 2017 and November 2017) regarding the sources of material he provided for the Steele dossier. Danchenko pleaded not guilty and was released on bail. In an order at the beginning of October 2022, the court "excluded from the trial large amounts of information that Mr. Durham had wanted to showcase" as not being evidence for the charges of making false statements. Danchenko was tried on four counts of lying to the FBI about one of his sources and, on October 18, acquitted by the jury on all four. The week before, the trial judge had acquitted Danchenko of a fifth count, stating that "[t]he prosecution had failed to produce sufficient evidence for that charge to even go to the jury."

Expenditures for the investigation
The costs of the inquiry before Durham's designation as Special Counsel are unknown. He reported expenditures in the amount of approximately $1.5 million from October 19, 2020, to March 31, 2021, including $934,000 on personnel and $520,000 on Justice Department units supporting the investigation. From April 1 to September 30, 2021, he reported expenditures of more than $2.3 million, including $1.9 million on personnel and $471,000 on Justice Department units supporting the investigation, "coinciding" with an uptick in activity from Durham and his team in recent months". By October 2020, the inquiry had cost a total of $3.8 million. Durham reported expenditures of $2 million for the period of October 2021 to March 2022, which did not include the costs of Sussman's trial and acquittal in May 2022. Following Danchenko's acquittal, it was reported $5.8 million had been spent on expenditures between October 2020 and March 2022, according to the Department of Justice records. On December 23, 2022, the Justice Department released financial documents indicating that $6.5 million were spent between October 2020 and September 2022, including $2 million in 2022.

Mueller investigation not a "complete and total exoneration"

A theme or "talking point" of ex-President Trump and his allies concerning the Mueller investigation into Russia's interference in the 2016 election is that the investigation ended in “the complete and total exoneration of President Trump". This line was used by Kayleigh McEnany shortly after she became White House Press Secretary. About a year earlier, Trump himself tweeted 'NO COLLUSION – NO OBSTRUCTION' on the day the Mueller report came out.

FactCheck.org states that while it is true that the investigation “did not establish that the [Trump] Campaign conspired and coordinated with the Russian government in its election-interference activities,"
on the issue of obstruction of justice, the report itself specifically says the investigation “does not exonerate him.” 
Our investigation found multiple acts by the President that were capable of exerting undue influence over law enforcement investigations, including the Russian-interference and obstruction investigations.

The incidents were often carried out through one-on-one meetings in which the President sought to use his official power outside of usual channels. These actions ranged from efforts to remove the Special Counsel and to reverse the effect of the Attorney General’s recusal; to the attempted use of official power to limit the scope of the investigation; to direct and indirect contacts with witnesses with the potential to influence their testimony.

The report did not recommend the prosecution of Trump because based on the opinion by the Office of Legal Counsel it did not have the authority to do so. According to the Office, “the indictment or criminal prosecution of a sitting President would impermissibly undermine the capacity of the executive branch to perform its constitutionally assigned functions” in violation of “the constitutional separation of powers.”

“Accordingly, while this report does not conclude that the President committed a crime, it also does not exonerate him.”

See also
 Alternative media (U.S. political right)
 Cyberwarfare by Russia
 Cyberwar: How Russian Hackers and Trolls Helped Elect a President
 Fox News controversies
 List of conspiracy theories promoted by Donald Trump
 Social media in the 2016 United States presidential election
 Timelines related to Donald Trump and Russian interference in United States elections

Further reading

References

External links
 

Russian interference in the 2016 United States elections
Donald Trump 2016 presidential campaign
Foreign electoral intervention
2019 controversies in the United States
2019 in American politics
Conspiracy theories promoted by Donald Trump